The Havsnäs Wind Farm is the largest onshore wind farm in Sweden. The wind farm consists of 48 Vestas V90 wind turbines.  The 95.4 megawatt wind farm was officially opened on September 2 2010. It is owned by Fu-Gen AG (75%) .

References

Wind farms in Sweden